Bart Ravelli (born November 16, 1987 in Heemstede) is a professional squash player from the Netherlands. He reached a career-high world ranking of World No. 123 in the July 2011.

References

External links 
 
 

1987 births
Living people
Dutch male squash players
People from Heemstede
Sportspeople from North Holland